Villa El Salvador (VES) is an urban, largely residential coastal district on the outskirts of Lima, Peru. It borders the district of Chorrillos on the east; the Pacific Ocean on the southwest; Lurín on the southeast; Villa María del Triunfo on the east and San Juan de Miraflores on the north.

History 
Villa El Salvador began in 1971 as a squatted pueblo joven (or shanty town) in the vast, empty sand flats to the south of Lima because of the urgent housing needs of immigrant families who had left the sierra of central Peru. A land invasion quickly created a town of 25,000 people. By 2008, it had grown to 350,000 people. Villa El Salvador evolved into a huge urban zone, largely self-organizing, for which it won some fame. Largely through the efforts of its inhabitants, the neighborhood was supplied with electricity, water, and sewerage.

Villa El Salvador served as the home base for the activist María Elena Moyano, who helped organize the Federación Popular de Mujeres de Villa El Salvador (Fepomuves), a federation of women, which grew to encompass activities such as public kitchens, health committees, the Vaso de Leche program (which supplied children with milk), income-generating projects, and committees for basic education.  Moyano was killed by members of the Shining Path, which used Villa El Salvador as a base in Lima.

Since June 1, 1983, Villa El Salvador has been formally (by law № 23605) established as a district within the Lima Province. In 1987, the community received a Prince of Asturias Award in recognition of its achievements. Villa El Salvador is twinned with Rezé, France and, since 2006,  with Tübingen, Germany.

Authorities

Mayors 
 2019-2022: Kevin Íñigo Peralta.
 2011-2014: Guido Íñigo Peralta. 
 2003-2010: Jaime Zea Usca. 
 1999-2002: Martín Pumar Vílchez.

Festivities 
 October: Lord of Miracles

Twin towns
  Arnhem in Gelderland, Netherlands
  Amstelveen in North Holland, Netherlands
  Tübingen in Baden-Württemberg, Germany

Historical slum photos

See also 
 Administrative divisions of Peru

References

External links

 Municipalidad de Villa El Salvador – Villa El Salvador district council official website
 Amigos de Villa – Association of Friends of Villa El Salvador, Lima - Perú
 PortalVES – District Portal Villa El Salvador, Lima - Perú

Districts of Lima
1971 establishments in Peru
Shanty towns in South America
Revolutionary Government of the Armed Forces of Peru